George P. Bucci Jr. (born July 9, 1953) is an American former basketball player.

He played collegiately for the Manhattan College.

He was selected by the Buffalo Braves in the third round (52nd pick overall) of the 1975 NBA draft and by the New York Nets in the 1975 ABA Draft.

He played for the New York Nets in the American Basketball Association (ABA) during the 1975–76 season and won an ABA championship with them. He was not used much as their 5th guard, and during the season the team permitted him to start an oil distribution company.

The Net's cut Bucci before the 1976-77 season. From 1977 until 1992 he played in the Lega Basket Serie A

In the 1990s he was elected to political office, as councilman and later supervisor of Newburgh, New York.

In 2018, Bucci was inducted into MAAC Honor Roll.

References

External links
 

1953 births
Living people
American expatriate basketball people in Italy
American men's basketball players
Basketball players from New York (state)
Buffalo Braves draft picks
Fortitudo Pallacanestro Bologna players
Manhattan Jaspers basketball players
Mens Sana Basket players
Montecatiniterme Basketball players
New York Nets draft picks
New York Nets players
People from Cornwall, New York
Shooting guards
Sportspeople from Newburgh, New York